The Didymocarpoideae are a subfamily of plants in the family Gesneriaceae. It was formerly the subfamily Cyrtandroideae.  This subfamily consists mostly of tropical and subtropical Old World genera, found in Africa, Asia and the Pacific. One species (Rhynchoglossum azureum) is native to Central and South America.

Description
Didymocarpoideae is one of two main subfamilies in the Gesneriaceae, the other being Gesnerioideae. (The third subfamily, Sanangoideae, contains only the genus Sanango.) Didymocarpoideae seedlings usually have cotyledons which become different in size and shape (anisocotylous). One cotyledon ceases to grow at some point and then withers away. The other continues to grow, and in extreme cases may grow to become very large and be the only leaf on the plant (Monophyllaea, some Streptocarpus).  Didymocarpoideae flowers usually have two fertile stamens, less often four and rarely one or five. The ovary is always superior. The fruit is usually a dry capsule, although other kinds of fruit, such as a fleshy berry, are also found.

Tribes and genera
A classification published in 2020 divides the subfamily into two tribes.
 Tribe Epithemateae

 Epithema
 Gyrogyne
 Loxonia
 Monophyllaea
 Rhynchoglossum
 Stauranthera
 Whytockia

 Tribe Trichosporeae

 Aeschynanthus
 Agalmyla
 Allocheilos
 Allostigma
 Anna
 Beccarinda
 Billolivia
 Boea
 Boeica
 Briggsiopsis
 Cathayanthe
 Championia
 Chayamaritia
 Codonoboea
 Conandron
 Corallodiscus
 Cyrtandra
 Damrongia
 Deinostigma
 Didissandra
 Didymocarpus
 Didymostigma
 Dorcoceras
 Emarhendia
 Glabrella
 Gyrocheilos
 Haberlea
 Hemiboea
 Henckelia
 Hexatheca
 Jerdonia
 Kaisupeea
 Leptoboea
 Liebigia
 Litostigma
 Loxocarpus
 Loxostigma
 Lysionotus
 Metapetrocosmea
 Microchirita
 Middletonia
 Orchadocarpa
 Oreocharis
 Ornithoboea
 Paraboea
 Petrocodon
 Petrocosmea
 Platystemma
 Primulina
 Pseudochirita
 Rachunia
 Ramonda, including Jankaea
 Raphiocarpus
 Rhabdothamnopsis
 Rhynchotechum
 Ridleyandra
 Senyumia
 Sepikea
 Somrania
 Spelaeanthus
 Streptocarpus, including Saintpaulia
 Tetraphyllum (syn. Tetraphylloides)
 Tribounia

Distribution
The species of the subfamily Didymocarpoideae are native to Europe, Africa, Asia, Malesia, the Pacific and Australia, except for a single species, Rhynchoglossum azureum, which is native to the Neotropics (Central and South America).

References

External links
 
 

Didymocarpoideae
Plant subfamilies